Boris Tomiak (born 11 September 1998) is a German professional footballer who plays as a defender for  club 
1. FC Kaiserslautern.

Career
Born in Essen, Tomiak played youth football for FC Stoppenberg, SSV Rotthausen and Rot-Weiss Essen before moving to Schalke 04 in 2012. He returned to Rot-Weiss Essen in 2016, and was promoted to Essen's first team in February 2017. He made his debut for the club on 8 April 2017 in a 1–1 draw with Borussia Dortmund II in the Regionalliga West. He scored once in 25 appearances for Rot-Weiss Essen before leaving the club in summer 2019. 

Tomiak joined Wattenscheid 09 in June 2019. He made ten appearances for the club in the Regionalliga West, but the club were withdrawn from the Regionalliga West in October 2019 due to insolvency. He joined Altona 93 for the second half of the season, where he made 1 appearance.

In May 2020, it was announced that Tomiak would join Fortuna Düsseldorf II for the 2020–21 season. He appeared 27 times in the Regionalliga West during the 2020–21 season. In summer 2021, he joined 1. FC Kaiserslautern of the 3. Liga on a free transfer, with his contract at Fortuna having expired. He made his debut for the club in a 0–0 draw with Eintracht Braunschweig on 24 July 2021.

References

External links

1999 births
Living people
German footballers
Footballers from Essen
Association football defenders
Rot-Weiss Essen players
FC Schalke 04 players
SG Wattenscheid 09 players
Altonaer FC von 1893 players
Fortuna Düsseldorf II players
1. FC Kaiserslautern players
Regionalliga players
3. Liga players